Channel W was a Malaysian television channel broadcasting news, business matters, entertainment, and interviews. The 'W' stands for 'Warta', which translates to gazette in English.

Channel launches 

The channel was first launched in 2011 as Capital TV and began airing on 29 March 2012. Originally the programming were primarily in English, but over time there was an increase in the number of Malaysian language programs. On 3 January 2018, Capital TV changed its name to Channel W.

Channel Closed 

After 7 years of broadcasting, Channel W cease broadcasting on 1 April 2019. Replaced with TVS at myFreeview on 6 February 2021.

References

External links

Channel W Wajah Baharu Capital TV dan Akhbar Warta https://mykmu.net/2018/01/channel-w-wajah-baharu-capital-tv-dan-akhbar-warta/
Capital TV is now called Channel W https://web.archive.org/web/20180813192410/http://www.capitaltv.my/capital-tv-is-now-called-channel-w/

Television stations in Malaysia